Lee Henry McCulloch (born 14 May 1978) is a Scottish professional football coach and former player. He is the first team assistant manager at Scottish Premiership club Heart of Midlothian.

McCulloch was capped on eighteen occasions by the Scotland national football team. During his career he has played for Motherwell, Wigan Athletic, Rangers and Kilmarnock at club level. He played mostly as a central defender or a defensive midfielder during his time at Rangers (he also played striker for the club when required) but has also played as an attacking midfielder and winger during his time in English football.

Towards the end of his playing career, McCulloch was appointed a coach at Kilmarnock. He was appointed interim manager in January 2016 and February 2017. He was appointed manager on a permanent basis in June 2017, but left in September 2017.

In January 2019, McCulloch joined Dundee United as strikers' coach, before being promoted to assistant head coach in August 2019. In August 2020, McCulloch joined Heart of Midlothian as assistant manager, after Robbie Neilson's move to Hearts manager.

Club career

Motherwell 
McCulloch started his career as a forward at hometown club Motherwell, graduating from their youth system having previously played at Rangers SABC (a boys' team affiliated to Rangers) alongside Barry Ferguson. Upon recovering from a broken ankle suffered during a loan spell with Carluke Rovers, McCulloch had an early experience of European football in the 1995–96 UEFA Cup under manager Alex McLeish, and went on to score 27 goals in 147 appearances for the Steelmen after making his debut against Raith Rovers on 24 August 1996. He scored his first and second goals in a league match against Hibernian on 31 January 1998.

After netting 12 and nine goals in consecutive seasons for Motherwell, along with some impressive performances, other clubs began to take notice of the young striker.

Wigan Athletic
McCulloch signed for Wigan Athletic in March 2001 for £700,000, (a then club signing record) on the same day as Motherwell teammate Steve McMillan. Wigan at this point were plying their trade in the third tier of English football, but were strongly ambitious, and saw the young Scotsmen as part of their long-term plans. McCulloch made his debut against Swindon Town on 3 March 2001 and scored his first goal for the club four weeks later, in a 2–1 win away to Wycombe Wanderers.

During his English league career, McCulloch found himself increasingly operating in a left midfield role, and this is the position he mainly played in during Wigan's first season in the Premier League in 2005–06. He weighed in with five league goals in thirty appearances, helping Wigan to a 10th-place finish, and appeared as a substitute in the 2006 League Cup Final.

In January 2007, McCulloch was the subject of a £750,000 bid by Rangers. It was turned down by Wigan and labelled "derisory" by manager Paul Jewell. In May 2007, McCulloch told BBC Sport that he would relish the opportunity to play for Rangers, and the new manager at Wigan Athletic Chris Hutchings advised him that he may leave to move back to Scotland. On 23 June, Rangers had a bid of £1.5m rejected with Wigan said to want £2.5m for McCulloch, who had scored 46 goals in 241 matches for them.

Rangers 
On 11 July 2007, Rangers signed McCulloch on a four-year deal with a transfer fee of £2.25m. McCulloch started his Rangers career with a goal on his debut in a 2–0 victory over FK Zeta on 31 July 2007. On 2 October 2007 in the 2007–08 UEFA Champions League, he scored the first goal, a header from a corner by DaMarcus Beasley in Rangers' 3–0 victory at the Stade de Gerland against Lyon.

On 23 December in a match with Aberdeen, McCulloch was sent off after 37 minutes after jumping at Aberdeen's Scott Severin as a mass brawl started, after Aberdeen's Chris Clark had scythed down Rangers defender Alan Hutton. McCulloch was the only player to be dismissed in the heated match. Later that season McCulloch played in the 2008 UEFA Cup Final, the 2008 Scottish League Cup Final and the 2008 Scottish Cup Final. Rangers lost the UEFA Cup Final but won a domestic cup double.

In his second season at Ibrox, McCulloch was again plagued with injuries. However, he did also manage to play for the club at central defence and as a defensive midfielder. In the first game of the 2009–10 season McCulloch scored a long range goal against Falkirk in a 4–1 win. The following match he scored his second goal of the season against Hearts: a header from a free kick that equalised for Rangers before Kris Boyd scored the winner in the 89th minute. On 3 January 2010 in the second Old Firm game of the season, McCulloch scored a header from a corner to tie the game 1–1. This was McCulloch's first ever Old Firm goal. McCulloch became a regular in central midfield as of 2009–10 season.

On 12 August 2010, Rangers announced that McCulloch had signed a two-year contract extension, keeping him at the club until 2013. His first game of the 2010–11 season came against St. Johnstone in which he set up the winner. McCulloch then went on to feature 27 times until it was revealed, after limping off against Hearts, he would require surgery to cure a cyst on his knee joint. McCulloch's versatility saw him play in attack, midfield and defence, and he hit a particularly good vein of form as a powerful striker as Rangers threadbare squad put together a decent run of results following the club's entry into administration.
His commitment to the cause was never under question, and he made it clear from the outset that no matter what happened to the club, he would be staying at Ibrox. The business and assets of Rangers, including player registrations, were purchased by a brand new company led by Charles Green. While many players opted out of joining the new company, McCulloch was one of the few senior players who accepted the transfer. Rangers entered the Scottish Football League Third Division, the fourth tier of the Scottish football league system. He scored in extra time to give Rangers a 2–1 victory against Brechin City in the Scottish Challenge Cup on 29 July 2012. McCulloch was given the captaincy on 1 September 2012 after the departure of Carlos Bocanegra to Racing Santander on a season-long loan and on 31 October, he signed a contract extension with Rangers committing him until 2015.

On 12 March 2014, McCulloch scored a hat trick against Airdrieonians in a 3–0 win that clinched the League One championship. McCulloch was inducted into the Rangers Hall of Fame in March 2014, along with former Rangers players Nacho Novo and Fernando Ricksen. His first goal this season was in the Scottish Challenge Cup against Clyde that they won 8–1 and during this game he scored twice. His first league goal was in a 4–1 victory over Dumbarton His first booking was in the Scottish Challenge Cup against Alloa Athletic that they lost 3–2. In December 2014, McCulloch was appointed player/coach for the Rangers first team after manager Ally McCoist was placed on gardening leave. In a 2–2 draw against Falkirk near the end of the season, McCulloch was jeered by some of the Rangers support after he had made an error leading to a goal for Falkirk. In July 2015, McCulloch left Rangers at the end of his contract. McCulloch said after leaving Rangers that the 2014–15 season had been his worst in football, with the team failing to gain promotion and off-field issues affecting performances. He also said that he had wanted to comment publicly on the club's problems, but was ordered not to by the club hierarchy.

Kilmarnock 
McCulloch signed for Kilmarnock as a player/coach in July 2015. He said after joining Kilmarnock that although he had registered as a player, he did not expect to play many games for the club and that his main responsibility would be to develop younger players. He made one appearance in total that season, starting in a league match against Ross County, being replaced after forty-one minutes.

International career 
McCulloch earned his first international call-up to the Scotland national side in 2004, under the then manager Berti Vogts, and made his debut as a late substitute in a 1–1 draw with Moldova, a match which transpired to be Vogts' last match as manager.
After the appointment of Walter Smith in 2004, he featured in the squad intermittently. He was involved in Smith's first three matches as manager against Italy, Moldova and Belarus and was included in the Kirin Cup matches against Bulgaria and Japan. He played in Scotland's famous 1–0 win over France in October 2006 and then in the equally famous reverse fixture, which Scotland also won 1–0.

He scored his first international goal in Scotland's Euro 2008 qualifying win over Ukraine. It was the second goal in a 3–1 victory at Hampden Park in October 2007. McCulloch retired from international football on 8 September 2008 as he wanted to concentrate on his club commitments. McCulloch was recalled to the national team following the appointment of Craig Levein and he made his first appearance since 2008 in a qualifier against Lithuania in September 2010.

Coaching career

Kilmarnock 
McCulloch was appointed Kilmarnock manager on an interim basis after Gary Locke resigned on 30 January 2016, managing two matches; a goalless draw with his former side Rangers in the Scottish Cup, and a 2–0 win over Motherwell in the league. He returned to his coaching duties after Lee Clark was appointed on a permanent basis in February 2016.

McCulloch and Peter Leven were put in temporary charge of the first team in February 2017, when Clark left Kilmarnock to manage Bury. He continued in interim charge until the end of the 2016–17 season, as Kilmarnock finished eighth in the Premiership. McCulloch was appointed Kilmarnock manager on a permanent basis on 5 June 2017. After the team failed to win any of their first eight league matches in 2017–18, McCulloch left Kilmarnock on 1 October 2017.

Post-Kilmarnock 
McCulloch was appointed assistant manager of Polish club Lechia Gdańsk in January 2018. He became assistant to Adam Owen, who had been a fitness coach at Rangers while McCulloch played for them. He left his position with Lechia Gdańsk after the sacking of Owen seven weeks later.

In January 2019, he was appointed strikers' coach at Dundee United under the management of Robbie Neilson, before being promoted to joint assistant head coach alongside Gordon Forrest in June 2019. In August 2020, after Neilson's appointment as manager, he was appointed assistant manager at Heart of Midlothian.

Career statistics

Club

International

Score and result list Scotland's goal tally first, score column indicates score after McCulloch goal.

Managerial statistics

Honours
Wigan Athletic
Football League Second Division: 2002–03
Football League First Division promotion: 2004–05
Football League Cup runner-up: 2005–06

Rangers
Scottish Premier League: 2008–09, 2009–10, 2010–11
Scottish League One: 2013–14
Scottish Third Division: 2012–13
Scottish Cup: 2007–08, 2008–09
Scottish League Cup: 2007–08, 2009–10, 2010–11
UEFA Cup: Runner-up 2007–08

Scotland
Kirin Cup: 2006

Individual
Rangers Player of the Year: 2013
PFA Scotland Third Division Team of the Year 2012–13
PFA Scotland League One Team of the Year: 2013–14
Rangers Hall of Fame Inductee: 2014

References

External links

1978 births
Living people
Footballers from Bellshill
Scottish footballers
Scotland international footballers
Scotland under-21 international footballers
Scotland B international footballers
Motherwell F.C. players
Wigan Athletic F.C. players
Rangers F.C. players
Premier League players
Scottish Premier League players
English Football League players
Association football wingers
Association football central defenders
Association football forwards
Association football utility players
Association football coaches
Cumbernauld United F.C. players
Carluke Rovers F.C. players
Scottish Junior Football Association players
Scottish Football League players
Scottish Professional Football League players
Kilmarnock F.C. players
Kilmarnock F.C. non-playing staff
Scottish football managers
Kilmarnock F.C. managers
Scottish Professional Football League managers
Scottish expatriate sportspeople in Poland
Dundee United F.C. non-playing staff
Heart of Midlothian F.C. non-playing staff